"Vette Motors" is a song by American rapper YoungBoy Never Broke Again, released on June 10, 2022 as the fourth single from his fourth studio album The Last Slimeto (2022). It was produced by Jason "Cheese" Goldberg, JetsonMade, OG Parker and Beezo.

Composition
In the song, NBA YoungBoy "flexes new flows and cadences", switching between aggressive rapping and melodic crooning, as he lists off his accomplishments, such as having new cars. The production is based on piano.

Critical reception
Charles Lyons-Burt of Slant Magazine considered the song to be a standout from The Last Slimeto, describing it as "YoungBoy savoring the syllables of every one of his words in a manner that recalls Playboi Carti's just-short-of-possessed vocalizations."

Charts

Certifications

References

2022 singles
2022 songs
YoungBoy Never Broke Again songs
Songs written by YoungBoy Never Broke Again
Songs written by OG Parker
Song recordings produced by OG Parker
Atlantic Records singles